Katie Alexandra Glynn  (born 14 March 1989) is a New Zealand field hockey player. She has competed for the New Zealand women's national field hockey team, including at the 2010 Commonwealth Games, the 2012 Summer Olympics and the 2014 Commonwealth Games.

Glynn was first selected for the Black Sticks Women in June 2009, along with ten other players as the Black Sticks squad was overhauled following its last place finish at the 2008 Beijing Olympics.

She was noted for the semi-final match between New Zealand and the Netherlands at the 2012 Olympics, where eleven minutes into the second half, she was accidentally smacked in the head by the hockey stick of opponent forward Ellen Hoog as Hoog attempted to shoot at goal. Despite the resulting wound in her head requiring five staples and two sutures, Glynn returned to the game later in the second half heavily bandaged, and later was compared to New Zealand cricketer Bert Sutcliffe and his return after a head injury in the 1953–54 South African tour.

References

External links
 

1989 births
Living people
New Zealand female field hockey players
Olympic field hockey players of New Zealand
Field hockey players at the 2010 Commonwealth Games
Field hockey players at the 2012 Summer Olympics
Field hockey players at the 2014 Commonwealth Games
Commonwealth Games silver medallists for New Zealand
Commonwealth Games bronze medallists for New Zealand
Commonwealth Games medallists in field hockey
Members of the New Zealand Order of Merit
20th-century New Zealand women
21st-century New Zealand women
Medallists at the 2010 Commonwealth Games
Medallists at the 2014 Commonwealth Games